Mahalina is a municipality in Madagascar. It belongs to the district of Antsiranana II, which is a part of Diana Region. According to 2001 census, the population of Mahalina was 2,217.

The majority 95% of the population are farmers. The most important crop is rice, while other important products are banana and coconut.  Fishing employs the rest 5% of the population.

References and notes 

Populated places in Diana Region